Ramadhan (born 1 September 2001) is an Indonesian professional footballer who plays as a forward for Liga 2 club PSCS Cilacap.

Club career

Persiraja Banda Aceh
He was signed for Persiraja Banda Aceh to play in Liga 1 in the 2021 season. Ramadhan made his first-team debut on 29 August 2021 in a match against Bhayangkara at the Indomilk Arena, Tangerang.

Career statistics

Club

Notes

References

External links
 Ramadhan at Soccerway

2001 births
Living people
Indonesian footballers
Persiraja Banda Aceh players
Association football forwards
Sportspeople from Aceh